The Touraine is a historic building in Philadelphia, Pennsylvania. The 13-story building was originally constructed in 1917 as a grand hotel. In 1983, it was converted into luxury apartments.

The building was listed on the National Register of Historic Places in 1982. It was added to the Philadelphia Register of Historic Places on January 7, 1982.

References

External links
Listing at Philadelphia Architects and Buildings

Residential buildings on the National Register of Historic Places in Philadelphia
Hotel buildings completed in 1917
Philadelphia Register of Historic Places
Rittenhouse Square, Philadelphia